Die Libelle (The Dragonfly) Op. 204 is a polka-mazurka composed by Josef Strauss in 1866.

Background 
Josef Strauss and his wife Caroline visited Traunstein and lake Traunsee in 1866. At that time, Josef saw dragonflies flying on the water surface. Inspired by this experience, he composed the Polka-mazurka  Die Libelle.

This work was premiered on 21 October 1866, immediately after the Austro-Prussian War, when the Austrian mood was still gloomy following its defeat.

Brahms's recording

Die Libelle was recorded by Johannes Brahms, together with his own Hungarian Dance no. 1 in 1889. The recording was severely damaged in World War II.

External links 
 Josef Strauss Die Libelle / Polka mazurka op. 204 (1866) – Commentary by Wiener Johann Strauss Orchester（WJSO）

Compositions by Josef Strauss
Polkas
1866 compositions
Fiction about insects